Nitin Dubey (born 3 July 1981) is an Indian singer, composer, actor, and lyricist. He is better known for his melodious singing and compositions in Chhattisgarhi cinema and has been working as a playback singer from last two decades. In year 2023 he was honoured with "Chhattisgarh Ratna" award for his contribution in the field of art and music.

Background 
Nitin Dubey was born on 3 July 1981, in Raigarh, Chhattisgarh, India. He completed his schooling from Raigarh and graduated from Guru Ghasidas Vishwavidyalaya, Chhattisgarh.

Since he was young, Dubey had a passion for singing. He grew up hearing his mother Kalindi Dubey singing bhajans for the puja. He began singing when he was 7 years old and he gave his first performance as a patriotic song on the school stage in same year 1988 on which he got first position. He also learned a lot from the singing of folk music by his father Paramhans Dubey. Dubey competed in a number of district and state-level music contests and rose to fame as a young musician. He practices singing the songs of famous singer Kishore Kumar, whom he idolises.

Gulabram Chauhan, the school's music teacher, mentored and taught him the fundamentals of music during his time in school. Later, Dubey began learning about Ragas, listening to renowned musician's tapes and reading books about classical music.

Career 
With the release of the album "Tain Deewani Main Deewana" in 2001, Nitin Dubey started his singing career from this album. Manmohini He Gaon Ke Goriya was the first song sung by Nitin Dubey, and it was followed by "Ud Ja Re Maina" and "Jawan De Jawan De Mola" in this album. Dubey thereafter began singing for numerous albums, such as "Hay Tor Bindiya", "Tain Mor Prem Deewani," and "Padosin Turi." In 2005, Dubey received much-needed popularity and recognition throughout the state of Chhattisgarh with the release of the album "Hay Mor Chandni.

In the years 2006 and 2007, he released two Chhattisgarhi bhajan CDs, "Chandraseni Amar Katha 1" and "Chandraseni Amar Katha 2". In 2009 and 2010, he further released the Hindi bhajan CDs "Chalo Shirdi Dham" and "Sancha Hai Maa Ka Darbar". In 2013, Dubey collaborated with well-known Bollywood vocalists Suresh Wadkar and Sadhana Sargam on the album "Sai Ka Sajda", which was released by the Mumbai-based company Ultra Music. After the publication of this CD, Dubey gained notoriety as a Sai Bhajan singer and began performing live and presenting bhajan shows in several Indian states. Some of his superhit bhajans are Sai Ka Sajda, Hanuman Chalisa, Tu Sai Sai Bol Re, Tu Bhaj Le Sai Prabhu Ka Naam, Chandraseni Amar Katha, Sancha Hai Ek Tera Hi Darbar Maa, Gauri Ke Lala, Ganpati Ganraj, Pratham Vandna and Chhattisgarh Ke Chhattis Devi.

In addition, Nitin Dubey has worked as a music director for a number of films in the Chhattisgarhi cinema, including "Mr. Majnu" and "Dil Pardesi Hoge Re." In the movie "Chal Hat Kono Dekh Lihi," he performed as a playback vocalist which was produced and directed by Satish Jain, a well-known figure in the Chhattisgarh film industry.

Dubey has also worked as an actor in his songs and albums.His songs are watched in many countries. He represents Chhattisgarh culture through his songs and has credit of performing more than 2000 stage shows to his name.

Dubey has also performed as a live singer in various state-level music festivals such as Chakradhar Samaroh,  Bhoramdev Mahotsav, Rajyotsava Mahotsav,  Jajwalyadev Mahotsav, and Kelo Mahotsav.

Nitin Dubey has more than 700,000 subscribers on his YouTube channel. And he became the most subscribed singer of Chhattisgarh.

In the year 2023, Dubey made the record of the most viewed Chhattisgarhi singer on YouTube.  And in the same year he gave live performance in many music festivals organized by Chhattisgarh government like Lok Madai Dongargaon, Mainpat Mahotsav, Chitrakot Mahotsav, Narayanpur Mata Mavli Mela and Pali Mahotsav.Dubey is continuously doing these stage shows to connect the youth with Chhattisgarhi music, recently he presented the Chhattisgarhi music among the people in the Mainpat Mahotsav in which festival Bollywood and Bhojpuri singers like Daler Mehndi, Pawan Singh also gave performance.Dubey also gave recently live rendition of bhajans in Navadha Ramayana''.

Controversy 
In 2022, Nitin Dubey's name was misused by some local artist to gather more crowds for a musical night organised at Tamnar town in Chhattisgarh.

Another case was brought in the same year against a local gang that was defrauding youth by using a fake Nitin Dubey's ID. These gangs also use Nitin Dubey's program names to collect money.

Discography

Albums 
Tain Deewani Main Deewana (2001)
Hay Tor Bindiya (2002)
Padosin Duri (2003)
Tain Mor Prem Diwani (2004)
Hay Mor Chandni (2005)
Chandraseni Amar Katha 1 (2006) 
Chandraseni Amar Katha 2 (2007)
Nitin Dubey Ganesh Bhajans (2008)
Chalo Shirdi Dham (2009)
Sancha hai Maa Ka Darbar (2010)
Sai Ka Sajda (2013)
Nitin Dubey Hindi Deshbhakti Geet (2020)

Bhajans 
Chandraseni Amar Katha (2006) 
Tu Bhaj Le Sai Prabhu Ka Naam (2009)
Tu Sai Sai Bol Re (2013)
Sai Ka Sajda (2013)
Pratham Vandana (2020)
Hanuman Chalisa (2021)
Sancha Hai Ek Tera Hi Darbar Maa (2021)
Gauri Ke Lala ho (2021)
Ganpati Ganraj (2021)
Chhattisgarh Ke Chhattis Devi (2021)
Bhole Ka Jogi (2021)
Kanwar Wala (2022)
Tola Sumar Sumar Ke Manavanv (2022)
Darbar Jana He (2022)

Popular songs 
Manmohini He Gaon Ke Goriya (2001)
Hay Mor Chandni (2005)
Hay Re Mor Kochaipan (2019)
Tor Bar Mor Dil Bekraar (2019)
Ka Tai Roop Nikhare Chandaini (2019)
O Jaaneman O Dilruba (2020)
Hay Tor Bindiya (2020)
Dhire Dhire (2020)
Hay Re Tor Kasam (2020)
Raigarh Wala Raja (2021)
Bachpan Ka Pyar (2021)
Chanda Re Reprise (2021)
Chandni 2 (2021)
Gulmohar (2021)
Dhadkan Ke Saaz (2021)
Barbad Kar Dehe Mola (2021)
Mata De Turi (2022)
Hay Re Mor Mungakadi (2022)
Dil Ke Dhadkan (2022)
Naach Mor Jaan (2022)
Tor Barat Lahun (2022)
Hay Re Mor Neelpari (2022)
Dil De De Durugwali (2022)
Barbad 2 Tain Mola Bhul Ja (2022)
Gonda Tola Re (2023)

Awards 
Chhattisgarh Ratna (2023)
Best Playback Singer (2023), for the song "Ka Tai Roop Nikhare Chandaini", from Mr. Majnu
Kelo Dharohar Samman (2023)
Chhattisgarh Melody King Award (2022)
Sai Aradhna Samman Award (2017)
Kala Anmol Ratna Award (2009)
Maati Ratna Award (2008)

References

External links 

1981 births
Indian singer-songwriters
Singers from Chhattisgarh
Hindi-language singers
Chhattisgarhi-language singers
Musicians from Chhattisgarh
Indian male playback singers
People from Raigarh
People from Raigarh district
People from Chhattisgarh
Living people
21st-century Indian singers
Male actors from Chhattisgarh
Actors from Chhattisgarh
Indian male composers
Indian composers
Indian male musicians
Indian musicians